Francesco Meli (born 15 May 1980 in Genoa) is an Italian operatic tenor particularly associated with the romantic repertoire. He began his vocal studies at age 17 with Norma Palacios at the Conservatorio di Musica "Niccolò Paganini" in Genoa. He later became a pupil of mezzo-soprano Franca Mattiucci. In 2002 he debuted in Verdi's Macbeth and as the tenor soloist in Rossini's Petite Messe Solennelle and Puccini's Messa di Gloria, broadcast by RAI (the Italian state broadcasting company) from the Festival dei Due Mondi in Spoleto. He has gone on to sing leading roles in La Scala, The Metropolitan Opera, Teatro Regio di Torino, London's  Royal Opera House, Opéra National de Lyon, Zurich Opera, and the Rossini Opera Festival in Pesaro. In 2017, he will make his debut as Verdi's Don Carlo at La Scala and as Radames in Salzburg next to Anna Netrebko's Aida.

Recordings
Gaetano Donizetti: Pia de' Tolomei - Cast: Patrizia Ciofi, Laura Polverelli, Dario Schmunck, Andrew Schroeder, Francesco Meli, Daniel Borowski. Conductor: Paolo Arrivabeni. CD recorded live from Teatro La Fenice, April 2004. Label: Dynamic
Gioachino Rossini: Bianca e Falliero - Cast: Maria Bayo, Daniela Barcellona, Francesco Meli, Carlo Lepore. Conductor: Renato Palumbo. DVD and CD recorded live from Teatro Rossini Pesaro, August 2005. Label: Dynamic
Gioachino Rossini: Torvaldo e Dorliska - Cast: Michele Pertusi, Darina Takova, Francesco Meli, Bruno Pratico. Conductor: Victor Pablo Perez. DVD and CD recorded love from Teatro Rossini Pesaro, August 2006. Label: Dynamic
Vincenzo Bellini: La sonnambula - Cast: Natalie Dessay, Francesco Meli, Carlo Colombara, Sara Mingardo. Conductor: Evelino Pido. CD recorded live from performances with the Opéra National de Lyon in Lyon and Paris, November 2006. Label: Virgin Classics
Gaetano Donizetti: Maria Stuarda - Cast: Anna Caterina Antonacci, Mariella Devia, Francesco Meli, Paola Gardina. Conductor: Antonino Fogliani. DVD recorded live from Teatro alla Scala, 2008. Label: Arthaus Musik.
Giuseppe Verdi: Giovanna d'Arco - Cast: Anna Netrebko, Plácido Domingo, Francesco Meli. Conductor: Paolo Carignani. CD recorded live at the Salzburg Festival in 2013. Label: Deutsche Grammophon.

References

Fairman, Richard, "Rigoletto, Royal Opera House, London", Financial Times, 11 February 2009. Accessed 6 March 2009.
Loomis, George, "Opera: Discovering Rossini's small gems", International Herald Tribune, 23 August 2006. Accessed 6 March 2009.
Mattioli, Alberto, "Intervista: Florez e Meli, al Regio - il derby dei tenorissimi", La Stampa, 15 May 2007.
Rosenblatt Recital Series, Biography: Francesco Meli (PDF), 6 June 2007. Accessed 6 March 2009.

Italian operatic tenors
Living people
1980 births
Musicians from Genoa
21st-century Italian male opera singers